Cross-country skiing was one of the competitions held at the 2019 Winter Deaflympics.

Medal table

Medal summary

Men

Women

Mixed

References 

2019 in snowboarding
2019 Winter Deaflympics events